Müge is a given name. Notable people with the name include:

Müge Anlı (born 1973), Turkish television presenter and journalist
Müge Çevik, Turkish-British physician

See also
Muge (surname)

Turkish feminine given names